Events in the year 1848 in Japan.

Incumbents
Monarch: Kōmei

Births
January 4 - Katsura Tarō (d. 1913), general and politician, 6th Prime Minister of Japan.

References 

 
1840s in Japan
Japan
Years of the 19th century in Japan